Mary Ann Rutherford Lipscomb (1848 — 1918) was an educator born in Athens, Georgia. Lipscomb believed in childhood education, and she helped make primary education required for all children in Georgia. 

After she was widowed, Lipscomb went to work at the Lucy Cobb Institute, under the direction of her sister, Mildred Lewis Rutherford; in 1895, Lipscomb took over leadership of that school. Lipscomb founded the Tallulah Falls School in 1909.

Both Lipscomb and Rutherford have student dormitories named after them at the University of Georgia. Lipscomb was named a Georgia Woman of Achievement in 2010.

References 

Early childhood education in the United States
People from Athens, Georgia
Educators from Georgia (U.S. state)
American women educators
1848 births
1918 deaths